Fenech-Soler is the eponymous debut studio album by British electropop band Fenech-Soler. It was released on 27 September 2010 by B-Unique Records.

The album includes the singles "Lies", "Demons" and "Stop and Stare". The three single were included in the 2014 special edition of their second studio album, Rituals along with the eighth track "Stonebridge".

Track listing

References

2010 albums
Fenech-Soler albums
B-Unique Records albums